Last of the Brooklyn Cowboys is a 1973 album by the American singer-songwriter Arlo Guthrie.

Track listing
All tracks composed by Arlo Guthrie; except where indicated

 "Farrell O'Gara" (Traditional) – 2:49
 "Gypsy Davy" (Traditional, Woody Guthrie) – 3:44
 "This Troubled Mind of Mine" (Ernest Tubb, Johnny Tyler) – 2:27
 "Week on the Rag" – 2:23
 "Miss the Mississippi and You" (Bill Halley) – 2:55
 "Lovesick Blues" (Irving Mills, Cliff Friend) – 2:35
 "Uncle Jeff" – 0:56
 "Gates of Eden" (Bob Dylan) – 5:16
 "Last Train" – 3:06
 "Cowboy Song" – 3:42
 "Sailor's Bonnett" (Traditional) – 1:23
 "Cooper's Lament" – 2:47
 "Ramblin' 'Round" (Woody Guthrie; music based on "Goodnight Irene" by Huddie Ledbetter and John Lomax) – 3:14

Personnel
 Arlo Guthrie – vocals, guitar, banjo, piano, harmonica
 Doug Dillard – banjo
 Clarence White – guitar
 Kevin Burke – fiddle
 Ry Cooder – guitar
 Buddy Collette – clarinet
 Ed Shaughnessy – drums, tabla
 Chuck Rainey – bass
 Stan Free – piano, harpsichord
 Jesse Ed Davis – guitar
 Gene Parsons – drums
 Clydie King – background vocals
 Jim Keltner – drums
 Grady Martin – guitar
 Buddy Alan – guitar
 Bob Arkin – bass
 George Bohanon – horn
 Jerry Brightman – steel guitar
 Donald Christlieb – woodwind
 Gene Coe – horn
 Nick DeCaro – accordion
 Barry Feldman – Executive Producer
 Venetta Fields – background vocals
 Gib Guilbeau – fiddle
 Bob Glaub – bass
 William Green – oboe
 Richie Hayward – drums
 Dick Hyde – trombone
 Thad Maxwell – bass
 Gene Merlino – background vocals
 Bob Morris – guitar
 John Pilla – guitar
 Thurl Ravenscroft – background vocals
 Don Rich – fiddle, guitar
 Jim Shaw – organ, piano
 Doyle Curtsinger – bass, mandolin
 Jessica Smith – vocals
 Robert Tebow – background vocals
 Mike Utley – organ
 Ernie Watts – flute
 Jerry Wiggins – drums
 Dick Hyde – horn
 Jesse Smith – background vocals
 Jim Gordon – piano
 Leland Sklar – bass
Technical
Judy Maizel - production manager
Marty Evans - photography

References

1973 albums
Arlo Guthrie albums
Albums produced by Lenny Waronker
Rising Son Records albums
Reprise Records albums